

486001–486100 

|-bgcolor=#f2f2f2
| colspan=4 align=center | 
|}

486101–486200 

|-id=170
| 486170 Zolnowska ||  || Marta Zolnowska (born 1974) is a child neurologist who has long treated patients with drug-resistant epilepsy. She has had significant input to clinical trials. Her main interest is focused on the efficacy of cannabinoids. In addition to great clinical work, she always shows a vivid passion for astronomy. || 
|}

486201–486300 

|-id=239
| 486239 Zosiakaczmarek ||  || Zosia Kaczmarek (born 1998) is a winner of 59th and 60th Polish Astronomy Olympiad in 2016 and 2017, and silver medalist in 10th International Olympiad on Astronomy and Astrophysics in India. Zosia is a diminutive of the name Zofia. || 
|}

486301–486400 

|-bgcolor=#f2f2f2
| colspan=4 align=center | 
|}

486401–486500 

|-id=416
| 486416 Mami ||  || Mami Laher (1954–2019) was the beloved wife of Russ and mother of son Josh. Born in Japan, she earned a B.A. in Sociology from Utah State University in 1984. She enjoyed jewelry making and figure skating. Mami translates to truth in Japanese. || 
|}

486501–486600 

|-bgcolor=#f2f2f2
| colspan=4 align=center | 
|}

486601–486700 

|-bgcolor=#f2f2f2
| colspan=4 align=center | 
|}

486701–486800 

|-bgcolor=#f2f2f2
| colspan=4 align=center | 
|}

486801–486900 

|-bgcolor=#f2f2f2
| colspan=4 align=center | 
|}

486901–487000 

|-id=958
| 486958 Arrokoth ||  || Arrokoth is the word for "sky" from the Powhatan language of native people from the Chesapeake Bay region. Institutions in this region played a prominent role in facilitating the discovery and exploration of this ancient and distant object. || 
|}

References 

486001-487000